Emma E. Hickox A.C.E (born 11 April 1964) is a British film editor based in Los Angeles and London.

A member of American Cinema Editors, Hickox has worked as a features and TV editor since the early 1990s. She has a varied and versatile resume from comedies, dramas and musicals, including large Hollywood films such as Bad Moms featuring Mila Kunis, Rock of Ages featuring Tom Cruise, and smaller independent films such as Becoming Jane with Anne Hathaway and The Boat That Rocked from Richard Curtis with Philip Seymour Hoffman.

She is a founding member of the British Independent Film Awards with the Debut Director's award given in her father's name, the Douglas Hickox Award. She is the daughter of Academy Award-winning film editor Anne V. Coates, and Douglas Hickox (died 1988), a cult British film director. John Coates, her uncle, was a film and TV producer for Yellow Submarine and The Snowman.

Hickox is represented by Wayne Fitterman at WME in Los Angeles, and Lynda Mamy of United Agents in London.

Personal life
She is married to Jonathon Burford, a Sotheby's auction house specialist, and they have two daughters, Matilda and Florence. Emma has two brothers, Anthony and James, and a sister, Diana.

Filmography

References

External links
 

Living people
1964 births
American Cinema Editors
British women film editors
English film editors
Film people from London